Henyk is a Ukrainian-language surname. The spelling "Ґеник" is transliterated as Genyk. Via the Russian language it is transliterated as Genik. Notable people with this surname include:

Anna Henyk, first wife of Yaroslav Halan
Cyril Genik (1857–1925), Ukrainian-Canadian immigration agent, a Person of National Historic Significance in Canada
George Genyk (1938–2017), American football lineman and coach
Jeff Genyk (born 1960), American football coach and former player, son of George

Ukrainian-language surnames